Eight vessels of the British Royal Navy have been named HMS Minerva, after the goddess Minerva of Roman mythology. 

  was a 32-gun fifth rate launched in 1759, captured by the French in 1778, recaptured in 1781 and renamed HMS Recovery.  She was sold in 1784.
  was a 38-gun fifth rate launched in 1780, converted to troopship Pallas in 1798, and broken up 1803.
  was a 29-gun storeship purchased in 1781 and sold 1783.
  was a 32-gun fifth rate launched in 1805 and broken up 1815.
  was a 46-gun fifth rate launched in 1820, sent to harbour service 1861, and sold 1895.
  was an  protected cruiser launched in 1895 and sold in 1920.
  was the monitor  converted to a coastal minelayer and renamed in 1925, renamed as a boom defence workshop C23(M), and as hulk C23 in 1946, and later known as RMAS Minerva.
  was a  launched in 1964 and sold for scrap in 1993.

See also
 Minerva (disambiguation)

Notes

Royal Navy ship names